Pacheco Creek may refer to several streams in California:

 Pacheco Creek (Contra Costa County), a tributary of Suisun Bay
 Pacheco Creek (San Benito County), a tributary of the Pajaro River in San Benito County and Santa Clara County
East Fork Pacheco Creek, a tributary stream
North Fork Pacheco Creek, a tributary stream
South Fork Pacheco Creek, a tributary stream

See also
Pacheco Reservoir, California, a reservoir formed by a dam on North Fork Pacheco Creek